The Idaho stop is the common name for laws that allow cyclists to treat a stop sign as a yield sign, and a red light as a stop sign. It first became law in Idaho in 1982, but was not adopted elsewhere until Delaware adopted a limited stop-as-yield law, the "Delaware Yield", in 2017. Arkansas was the second state to legalize both stop-as-yield and red light-as-stop in April 2019. Studies in Delaware and Idaho have shown significant decreases in crashes at stop-controlled intersections.

Legality by state

History
The original Idaho yield law was introduced as Idaho HB 541 during a comprehensive revision of Idaho traffic laws in 1982. At that time, minor traffic offenses were criminal offenses and there was a desire to downgrade many of these to "civil public offenses" to free up docket time.

Carl Bianchi, then the Administrative Director of the Courts in Idaho, saw an opportunity to attach a modernization of the bicycle law onto the larger revision of the traffic code. He drafted a new bicycle code that would more closely conform with the Uniform Vehicle Code, and included new provisions allowing cyclists to take the lane, or to merge left, when appropriate. Addressing the concerns of the state's magistrates, who were concerned that "technical violations" of traffic control device laws by cyclists were cluttering the court, the draft also contained a provision that allowed cyclists to treat a stop sign as a yield sign—the so-called "rolling stop law". The new bicycle law passed in 1982, despite objections among some cyclists and law enforcement officers.

In 2006, the law was modified to specify that cyclists must stop on red lights and yield before proceeding straight through the intersection, and before turning left at an intersection. This had been the original intent, but Idaho law enforcement officials wanted it specified.The law originally passed with an education provision, but that was removed in 1988 because "youthful riders quickly 
adapted to the new system and had more respect for a law that legalized actual riding behavior".

In 2001, Joel Fajans, a physics professor at the University of California at Berkeley, and Melanie Curry, a magazine editor, published an essay entitled "Why Bicyclists Hate Stop Signs" on why rolling stops were better for cyclists and it provided greater interest in the Idaho law.

The first effort to enact the law outside of Idaho was started in Oregon in 2003, when the Idaho law still only applied to stop signs. While it overwhelmingly passed in the House, it never made it out of the Senate Rules Committee. The Oregon effort in turn inspired an investigation of the law by the San Francisco Bay Area Metropolitan Transportation Commission in 2008. That investigation failed to spawn legislation, but it did garner national attention, which led to similar efforts nationwide.

The term "Idaho Stop" came into popular use as a result of the California effort in 2008. Prior to that, it was called "Idaho Style" or "Roll-and-go". "Idaho Stop" was popularized by the bicycle blogger Richard Masoner in June 2008 coverage of the San Francisco proposal, but in reference to the "Idaho Stop Law"; the term had been used in discussion since at least the year prior. In August of the same year, the term—now in quotes—first showed up in print in a Christian Science Monitor article by Ben Arnoldy who referred to the "so-called 'Idaho stop' rule". Soon after, the term "Idaho stop" was commonly being used as a noun, not a modifier.

Safety

A 2009 study showed a 14.5% decrease in bicyclist injuries after the passage of the original Idaho Stop law (though did not otherwise tie the decrease to the law). A Delaware state-run study of the "Delaware Yield" law (allowing cyclists to treat stop signs as yield signs) concluded that it reduced injuries at stop-sign controlled intersections by 23%.

A study of rolling stops in Seattle determined that "results support the theoretical assertion that bicyclists are capable of making safe decisions regarding rolling stop", while a 2013 survey of stop as yield in Colorado localities where it is legal reported no increase in crashes. Another study done in Chicago showed that compliance with stop signs and stop lights by cyclists was low when cross-traffic was not present, but that most were still performing an Idaho Stop; and therefore "enforcing existing rules at these intersections would seem arbitrary and [capricious]".

International approaches
Various approaches to stop-as-yield and red light-as-stop laws exist outside of the United States. In the Netherlands, many junctions are designed to avoid the need for a stop sign, using techniques such as roundabouts, marking the road to indicate who must yield to whom. In 2012 a trial in Paris allowed cyclists at 15 intersections to turn right or, if there is no street to the right, proceed straight ahead on red, under the condition that they "exercise caution" and yield to pedestrians, after road safety experts deemed the measure would reduce collisions. After the trial, French law was modified to allow cyclists to treat certain stop lights as yield signs as allowed by signage. Some French cities, like Lyon, have installed the sign on many red lights citywide.

Legislative history
Idaho is the longest practitioner of the stop-as-yield. Mark McNeese, Bicycle/Pedestrian Coordinator for the Idaho Transportation Department says that "Idaho bicycle-collision statistics confirm that the Idaho law has resulted in no discernible increase in injuries or fatalities to bicyclists."

The "Idaho Stop" has been state policy there since 1982. A 2010 UC Berkeley study found that cyclist injuries in the state dropped 14 percent.

Parts of Colorado have had legalized stop-as-yield laws for the second longest. In 2011, the cities of Dillon and Breckenridge, Colorado, passed stop-as-yield laws, in 2012 Summit County passed a similar law for its unincorporated areas, and in 2014, the City of Aspen passed one as well. Fort Collins considered the same law in 2013, but declined. In 2018, the state passed a law standardizing the language municipalities or counties could use to pass an Idaho Stop or Stop-as-yield ordinance and preventing it from applying to any state highway system. The act requires the cyclist to go through the intersection at a reasonable speed and sets the reasonable speed limit at 15 mph, but a municipality or county could reduce it to 10 mph or raise it to 20 mph at any individual intersection. The city of Thornton became the first city to legalize the "Safety Stop", following the change of law, when they did so in 2019. In April 2022, Colorado passed a law legalizing the practice statewide.

In 2017, 35 years after Idaho, Delaware became the second U.S. state to pass an Idaho Stop law. Delaware's law - known as the "Delaware Yield" - makes stop-as-yield legal, but it only applies on roads with one or two travel lanes. Cyclists must come to a complete stop at stop sign-controlled intersections with multi-lane roads.

Since 2003, Idaho stop style bills, or resolutions asking the state to pass one, have been introduced in Oregon, San Francisco, Minnesota, Arizona, Montana, Utah, Washington DC, New York City, Santa Fe, Oklahoma, Edmonton, Colorado, California, New Jersey, and Virginia  with various levels of success. Arkansas governor Asa Hutchinson signed the Arkansas "Idaho stop" law in April 2019. 
Oregon's "Stop as Yield" law became effective January 1, 2020. On August 6, 2019, Oregon Governor Kate Brown signed Stop as Yield into law with an effective date of January 1, 2020. Washington State legalized stop-as-yield in October 2020. On March 18, 2021, Utah Governor Spencer Cox signed Stop as Yield into law for the state and on the next day, North Dakota Governor Doug Burgum signed a similar law for that state. On May 10, 2021, Oklahoma Governor Kevin Stitt signed House Bill 1770, which will allow cyclists to treat stop signs as yield signs and stop lights as stop signs effective November 1, 2021. 

In December 2022, Washington, DC adopted the Safer Streets Amendment Act which allows cyclists to yield at stop signs. The Act also allows cyclists to turn right at a red light after stopping. An earlier version of the bill included a general ‚Red Light as Stop‘ provision but this was replaced with a provision that would allow ‚Red Light as Stop‘ only at specific intersections with signage posted.

Positions
Advocates for Idaho stop laws argue that they improve safety. One study showed that Idaho has less severe crashes. Similarly, tests of a modified form of the Idaho Stop in Paris found that "allowing the cyclists to move more freely cut down the chances of collisions with cars, including accidents involving the car's blind spot". Some supporters maintain that changing the legal duties of cyclists provides direction to law enforcement to focus attention where it belongs—on unsafe cyclists (and motorists). Additionally, some claim that, because bicycle laws should be designed to allow cyclists to travel swiftly and easily, the Idaho stop provision allows for the conservation of energy.  

Opponents of the law maintain that a uniform, unambiguous set of laws that apply to all road users is easier for children to understand and allowing cyclists to behave by a separate set of rules than drivers makes them less predictable and thus, less safe. Jack Gillette, former president of the Boise Bicycle Commuters Association, argued that bicyclists should not have greater freedoms than drivers. "Bicyclists want the same rights as drivers, and maybe they should have the same duties", he said. San Francisco Mayor Edwin M. Lee argued without citing evidence that the law "directly endangers pedestrians and cyclists" in his veto of a similar law in the city.

Related laws

Many US states have laws allowing cyclists (and motorcyclists) to stop at and then proceed through a red light if the light doesn't change due to the inability of the embedded sensors in the ground to detect them. Such laws often require that the cyclist stop, confirm that there is no oncoming traffic, and proceed after waiting a certain amount of time or cycles of the light. These are known as "Dead Red" laws.

Lane splitting, which allows people on bicycles and motorcycles to "filter" through stopped or slow-moving traffic, is legal in a handful of US states and large parts of the world.

In countries that do not generally allow right turns on red, some allow right turns on red for cyclists, either in general as in Denmark and Belgium, or where specifically marked, such as Germany and France.

References

External links
 Video explanation of Idaho Stop

Bicycle law
Cycling safety
Idaho law
Utility cycling
1982 in Idaho
1982 introductions
2017 in Delaware
Delaware law
Traffic law
Road transportation in Delaware
Road transportation in Idaho